The History Channel (also known as History) is a Canadian English language specialty channel that primarily broadcast programming related to history and historical fiction. It is owned by Corus Entertainment, with the History branding used under a licensing agreement with A+E Networks. The channel operates two time-shifted feeds: East (Eastern Time) and West (Pacific Time). The West Coast feed was launched on September 1, 2006.

History
Licensed by the Canadian Radio-television and Telecommunications Commission (CRTC) on September 4, 1996 as The History and Entertainment Network, the channel was originally owned by Alliance Atlantis Communications, and launched as History Television on October 17, 1997.

On January 18, 2008, a joint venture between Canwest and Goldman Sachs Capital Partners known as CW Media bought Alliance Atlantis and gained AAC's interest in History Television. On October 8, 2009, Canwest launched a high definition simulcast of History Television.  History Television HD initially only had one national feed operating from the Eastern Time Zone. It is available through all major TV providers in Canada.

On October 27, 2010, ownership changed again as Shaw Communications gained control of History Television as a result of its acquisition of Canwest and Goldman Sachs' interest in CW Media. On May 30, 2012, Shaw Media announced that History Television would be rebranded as a Canadian version of U.S. cable channel History on August 12, 2012, through a wider licensing agreement with A+E Networks. Fellow Shaw network, The Cave, was also rebranded as a Canadian version of spin-off network H2.

On April 1, 2016, History and its sister channel H2 were sold to Corus Entertainment.

An HD feed for the network for western Canada was launched on September 18, 2019.

In January 2022, the network converted its imaging to the current American logo introduced in the fall of 2021, and like the American network uses "History" and "The History Channel" interchangeably.

Programming

The channel's programming includes documentaries, reality shows, films, and human interest series. In addition to shows acquired from its American counterpart, History also produces and commissions several original programs of its own, including Restoration Garage, Yukon Gold, and Vikings.

Under the History Television branding, the network also aired a special called Fact & Film which shows a program on a topic and then a movie on the same subject.

Logo

See also
 List of documentary channels
 List of Canadian television channels
 Historia, French-Canadian TV channel
 History (American TV channel)

References

External links
 

Television channels and stations established in 1997
Analog cable television networks in Canada
A&E Networks
Corus Entertainment networks
English-language television stations in Canada
Television channels and networks about history
1997 establishments in Canada